Ben McNiece (born 22 March 1992) is a former professional Australian rules footballer who played for the Essendon Football Club in the Australian Football League (AFL). He was recruited by Essendon as a category B rookie through the next generation academy in November 2016, qualifying by virtue of his mother being Indian. He had previously played for Essendon's VFL team for the prior two seasons. He made his AFL debut in the Anzac Day clash against  at the Melbourne Cricket Ground in round five of the 2017 season in an eighteen-point win.

References

External links

   

1992 births
Living people
Essendon Football Club players
Australian rules footballers from Victoria (Australia)
Australian people of Anglo-Indian descent
Australian sportspeople of Indian descent